Rodrigo López Quiñones (born 12 November 2001) is a Mexican professional footballer who plays as a midfielder for Liga MX club Querétaro.

Career statistics

Club

References

External links
 
 
 

Living people
2001 births
Mexican footballers
Association football midfielders
Liga MX players
Querétaro F.C. footballers
Footballers from Mexico City